is a Japanese television drama series based on the manga by Kei Ishizaka. It premiered on TV Asahi on 16 April 2015, starring Takuya Kimura and Aya Ueto. The drama received a viewership rating of 14.8% on average, and it was the highest rating for any other television drama in April–June term 2015. There is the NHK adapted version titled  in 2004.

Plot

Hisashi Ieji (Takuya Kimura), a successful securities' company employee gets injured in an explosion. The accident causes him amnesia, deleting last 5 years from his memory.  He doesn't recognize his current family, seeing their faces as emotionless masks but remembers well his ex-wife and their daughter. On top of that his former aggressive and selfish personality disappears giving way to a considerate and caring man. The company higher-ups transfer Hisashi to a marginal, "drop-outs" department but instead of neglecting him closely watch his every move.

Cast

Main
 Takuya Kimura as Hisashi Ieji
 Aya Ueto as Megumi Ieji
 Miki Mizuno as Kaoru Nozawa
 Kei Tanaka as Tsuyoshi Honjō
 Miyu Yoshimoto as Yua Takanashi
 Toshiyuki Nishida as Yukio Kozukue

Guest
 Teruyuki Kagawa as Masao Takeda (ep.1)
 Saki Takaoka as a hostess at a bar in Ginza (ep.1)
 Akiko Hinagata (ep.4)
 Jun Fubuki as Azusa Ieji (ep.5)
 Kin'ya Kitaōji as Yōzō Kitaōji (ep.7)
 Yūsuke Santamaria (ep.9)
 Nozomi Sasaki (ep.10)

Episodes

References

External links
  
 

Japanese drama television series
2015 in Japanese television
2015 Japanese television series debuts
2015 Japanese television series endings
TV Asahi television dramas